Aziz Rabbah (born 1962 in Sidi Kacem, Morocco) is a Moroccan politician from the Justice and Development Party. On 3 January 2012, he became Minister of Transportation and equipment in  Abdelilah Benkirane's government.

See also
Justice and Development Party

References

External links
Ministry of Transportation and Equipment

Living people
Government ministers of Morocco
People from Sidi Kacem
Moroccan engineers
Moroccan activists
1962 births
Transport ministers
Moroccan civil servants
Justice and Development Party (Morocco) politicians
Université Laval alumni